Syed Ahmed Quadri is an Indian former first-class cricketer who played for Hyderabad cricket team in domestic cricket. He was also a member of defunct IPL team Deccan Chargers

References

Indian cricketers
Hyderabad cricketers
Living people
1981 births
Cricketers from Hyderabad, India